Geoffrey D. Borman is an American quantitative methodologist and policy analyst.  He received his Ph.D. from the University of Chicago in 1997 and is currently the Alice Wiley Snell Endowed Professor at Arizona State University, Director of the Arizona State University Education Sciences Graduate Program, and Editor of Educational Evaluation and Policy Analysis.

Activities and interests
Borman's main research interests revolve around social stratification and the ways in which educational policies and practices can help address and overcome inequality.  His primary methodological interests include the synthesis of research evidence (or meta-analysis), the design of quasi-experimental and experimental studies of educational innovations, and the specification of school-effects models.

Borman's scholarship has contributed to understanding how federal education programs have reduced the persistent achievement gaps in American society.  His 2001 book, Title I: Compensatory Education at the Crossroads (Borman, Stringfield, & Slavin, 2001), discussed the history, student achievement effects, and future of the federal government's largest investment in elementary and secondary education: Title I of the Elementary and Secondary Education Act of 1965 (most recently reauthorized as the Every Student Succeeds Act.  His article "National Efforts to Bring Reform to Scale in High-Poverty Schools: Outcomes and Implications", traced the history and academic effects of America's investments in elementary and secondary education over the period 1965-2001 (Borman, 2005).

His work has advanced the evidence-based policy movement in the field of education and has demonstrated how randomized controlled trials (RCTs) can be applied to studying the large-scale effects of educational policies and programs implemented on a widespread basis in "real-world" field settings. Borman has directed multiple federally funded Institute of Education Sciences (IES) Ph.D. training programs in causal inference and interdisciplinary research and has led or co-directed over 25 major randomized controlled trials, which have included randomization and delivery of educational interventions at the student, classroom, school, and district levels. A notable example is his school-level RCT, "Final Reading Outcomes of the National Randomized Field Trial of Success for All" (Borman, Slavin, Cheung, Chamberlain, Madden, & Chambers, 2007), which estimated the effects of a popular nationally disseminated reading program for young children from high-poverty schools. This study was one of the first significant examples of a large-scale, school-level, cluster randomized trial conducted in the United States. When asked by Education Week reporter Deb Viadero about the study, the director of the Institute of Education Sciences of the U.S. Department of Education, Grover Whitehurst, was quoted as saying: "It's a sophisticated study that uses everything the evaluation field has come to recognize as high quality" (May 11, 2005, p. 2, 15).

Borman has been appointed as a methodological expert to advise many national research and development projects, including the National Research Center on the Gifted and Talented and three of the nation’s regional educational laboratories funded by the Institute of Education Sciences. In addition to his editorship of Educational Evaluation and Policy Analysis, he serves on the editorial boards of a number of academic journals, including the Journal of Research on Educational Effectiveness, Journal of Educational Psychology, and Elementary School Journal. He is a Principal Standing Panel Member of the Science, Technology, Engineering, and Mathematics (STEM) panel of the U.S. Department of Education, Institute of Education Sciences, has served as an expert panelist on several What Works Clearinghouse practice guides, and was named to the 15-member Urban Education Research Task Force established to advise the U.S. Department of Education on issues affecting urban education. His research has been funded by a variety of organizations, including the National Science Foundation, U.S. Department of Education, Office of Educational Research and Improvement, Institute of Education Sciences, American Educational Research Association Grants Program, Spencer Foundation, Open Society Institute, and Smith-Richardson Foundation, among others.

Awards and honors
Borman has achieved a number of prominent awards and honors and has been selected on multiple occasions by Education Week as one of the top 200 scholars having the most significant influence on United States education practice and policy. He was the recipient of a 2002 National Academy of Education/Spencer Postdoctoral Fellowship Award, the 2004 Early Career Award from the American Educational Research Association, the 2004 American Educational Research Association Review of Research Award, and the 2008 American Educational Research Association Palmer O. Johnson Award. When he received the American Educational Research Association Early Career Award in San Diego on April 14, 2004 at the Awards Presentation and Presidential Address of the American Educational Research Association Annual Meeting, Stephen Raudenbush, the Lewis-Sebring Distinguished Service Professor at the University of Chicago and the Chair of the Award Committee, stated that his "books and numerous articles have established Geoffrey Borman as one of the nation's premier researchers on federal education policy for children living in poverty." In 2009, Dr. Borman’s significant contributions to the field of education research were recognized by his nomination and selection as a Fellow of the American Educational Research Association. In 2015, Dr. Borman was awarded the Vilas Distinguished Achievement Professorship from the University of Wisconsin-Madison, in 2020, the Foundation Professorship from Arizona State University, and in 2021, the Alice Wiley Snell Endowed Professorship.

Select bibliography
Borman, G.D., Pyne, J., Rozek, C.S, & Schmidt, A.J. (2022). A replicable identity-based intervention reduces the Black-white suspension gap at scale. American Educational Research Journal, 59, 284-314.

Borman, G.D., Yang, H., Xie, X. (2021). A quasi-experimental study of the Kids Read Now summer reading program. Journal of Education for Students Placed at Risk, 26, 316-336.

Borman, G.D., Choi, Y., & Hall, G.J. (2021). The academic impacts of a brief middle-school self-affirmation intervention help propel African American and Latino students through high school. Journal of Educational Psychology, 113(3), 605–620. 

Pyne, J., & Borman, G.D. (2020). Replicating a scalable intervention that helps students reappraise academic and social adversity during the transition to middle school. Journal of Research on Educational Effectiveness, 13, 652-678.

Borman, G.D., Borman, T.H., Park, S., & Houghton, S. (2020). A multisite randomized controlled trial of the effectiveness of Descubriendo la Lectura. American Educational Research Journal, 57, 1995-2020.

Borman, T.H., Borman, G.D., Houghton, S., Zhu, B., Martin, A., & Wilkinson-Flicker, S. (2019). Addressing the literacy needs of struggling Spanish-speaking first graders: First-year results from a national randomized controlled trial of Descubriendo la Lectura. AERA Open, 5(3), 1-14.

Borman, G.D., Rozek, C., Pyne, J., & Hanselman, P. (2019). Reappraising academic and social adversity improves middle-school students’ academic achievement, behavior, and well-being. Proceedings of the National Academy of Sciences, 116, 16286-16291.

Borman, G., Grigg, J., Rozek, C., Hanselman, P., & Dewey, N. (2018). Self-affirmation effects are produced by school context, student engagement with the intervention, and time: Lessons from a district-wide implementation. Psychological Science, 29, 1773-1784.

Pyne, J., Rozek, C.S., & Borman, G.D. (2018). Assessing malleable social-psychological academic attitudes in early adolescence. Journal of School Psychology, 71, 57-71.
Tibbetts, Y., Priniski, S.J., Hecht, C.A., Borman, G.D., & Harackiewicz, J.M. (2018). Different institutions and different values: Exploring first-generation student fit at 2-year colleges. Frontiers of Psychology, 9, 502. doi:10.3389/fpsyg.2018.00502

Borman, G.D. (2017). Advancing values affirmation as a scalable strategy for mitigating identity threats and narrowing national achievement gaps. Proceedings of the National Academy of Sciences, 114, 7486-7488.

Hanselman, P., Rozek, C., Grigg, J., Pyne, J., & Borman, G.D. (2017). New evidence on self-affirmation effects and theorized sources of heterogeneity from large-scale replications. Journal of Educational Psychology, 109, 405-424.

Borman, G.D., & Pyne, J. (2016). What if Coleman had known about stereotype threat? How social-psychological theory can help mitigate educational inequality. RSF: The Russell Sage Foundation Journal of the Social Sciences, 2(5), 164-185.

Borman, G.D., Grigg, J., & Hanselman, P. (2016). An effort to close achievement gaps at scale through self-affirmation. Educational Evaluation and Policy Analysis, 38, 21-42.
Hanselman, P., Bruch, S.K., Gamoran, A., & Borman, G.D. (2014). Threat in context: School moderation of the impact of social identity threat on racial/ethnic achievement gaps. Sociology of Education, 87, 106-124.

Tipton, E., Hedges, L., Vaden-Kiernan, M., Borman, G., Sullivan, K., & Caverly, S. (2014).  Sample selection in randomized experiments: A new method using propensity score stratified sampling. Journal of Research on Educational Effectiveness, 7, 114-135.

Hanselman, P., & Borman, G.D. (2013). The impacts of Success for All on reading achievement in grades 3-5: Does intervening during the later elementary grades produce the same benefits as intervening early? Educational Evaluation and Policy Analysis, 35, 237-251.

Carlson, D., Borman, G.D., & Robinson, M. (2011). A multi-state district-level cluster randomized trial of the impact of data-driven reform on reading and mathematics achievement. Educational Evaluation and Policy Analysis, 33, 378-398. 

Benson, J., & Borman, G.D. (2010). Family and contextual socioeconomic effects across seasons: When do they matter for the achievement growth of young children? Teachers College Record, 112, 1338-1390.

Borman, G.D., & Dowling, N.M. (2010). Schools and inequality: A multilevel analysis of Coleman’s Equality of Educational Opportunity data. Teachers College Record, 112, 1201-1246.

Borman, G.D. (2009). The use of randomized trials to inform education policy. In G. Sykes, B. Schneider, D.N. Plank (Eds.), Handbook of education policy research (pp. 129–138). New York: Routledge.

Borman, G.D., Benson, J, & Overman, L. (2009). A randomized field trial of the Fast ForWord Language computer-based training program. Educational Evaluation and Policy Analysis, 31, 82-106.

Borman, G.D., & Grigg, J.A. (2009). Visual and narrative interpretation. In H. Cooper, L. Hedges, & J. Valentine (Eds.) The handbook of research synthesis (2nd ed.) (pp. 497–519). New York: Russell Sage Foundation.

Borman, G.D., & Dowling, N.M. (2008). Teacher attrition and retention: A meta-analytic and narrative review of the research. Review of Educational Research, 78, 367-409.

Borman, G.D., Dowling, N.M., & Schneck, C. (2008). A multi-site cluster randomized field trial of Open Court Reading. Educational Evaluation and Policy Analysis, 30, 389-407.

Borman, G.D., Gamoran, A., & Bowdon, J. (2008). A randomized trial of teacher development in elementary science: First-year achievement effects. Journal of Research on Educational Effectiveness, 1, 237-264.

Borman, G.D., Slavin, R.E., Cheung, A., Chamberlain, A., Madden, N., & Chambers, B. (2007). Final reading outcomes of the national randomized field trial of Success for All. American Educational Research Journal, 44, 701-731.

Borman, G.D., & Dowling, N.M. (2006). The longitudinal achievement effects of multi-year summer school: Evidence from the Teach Baltimore randomized field trial. Educational Evaluation and Policy Analysis, 28, 25-48.

Borman, G.D. (2005). National efforts to bring reform to scale in high-poverty schools: Outcomes and implications. In L. Parker (Ed.), Review of Research in Education, 29 (pp. 1–28). Washington, DC: American Educational Research Association.

Borman, G.D., & Boulay, M. (Eds.) (2004). Summer learning: Research, policies, and programs. Mahwah, NJ: Erlbaum.

Borman, G.D., Hewes, G.M., Overman, L.T., & Brown, S. (2003). Comprehensive school reform and achievement: A meta-analysis. Review of Educational Research, 73, 125-230.

Borman, G.D., Stringfield, S.C., & Slavin, R.E. (Eds.) (2001). Title I: Compensatory education at the crossroads. Mahwah, NJ: Erlbaum.

Borman, G.D., & D'Agostino, J.V. (1996). Title I and student achievement: A meta-analysis of federal evaluation results. Educational Evaluation and Policy Analysis, 18, 309-326.

References

External links
Borman's faculty page  at the University of Wisconsin–Madison

Year of birth missing (living people)
Living people
American educational theorists
University of Wisconsin–Madison faculty
University of Chicago alumni